The city of Tarsus was a Syriac Orthodox archdiocese, attested between the seventh and thirteenth centuries. Nearly twenty Syrian Orthodox metropolitans of Tarsus are mentioned either by Michael the Syrian or in other Syriac Orthodox narrative sources. The archdiocese is last mentioned towards the end of the thirteenth century, and seems to have lapsed during the fourteenth century.

Sources 

The main primary source for the Syriac Orthodox metropolitans of Tarsus is the record of episcopal consecrations appended to Volume III of the Chronicle of the Syriac Orthodox patriarch Michael the Syrian (1166–99).  In this Appendix Michael listed most of the bishops consecrated by the Syriac Orthodox patriarchs of Antioch between the ninth and twelfth centuries.  Twenty-eight Syriac Orthodox patriarchs sat during this period, and in many cases Michael was able to list the names of the bishops consecrated during their reigns, their monasteries of origin, and the place where they were consecrated.  For the thirteenth century, Michael's lists are supplemented by several references in other Syriac Orthodox narrative sources.

Location 
Tarsus, famed in Christian tradition as the birthplace of Saint Paul, was the metropolis of the Chalcedonian ecclesiastical province of Cilicia Prima.  It was an obvious site for a Syriac Orthodox diocese, and may have been the seat of a Syriac Orthodox bishop or metropolitan as early as the sixth century.

Metropolitans of Tarsus 
The earliest-known Syriac Orthodox metropolitan of Tarsus was Yohannan bar ʿEbrayta ('son of the Jew'), who consecrated the patriarch Severus bar Mashqe in 668.

Sixteen Syrian Orthodox metropolitans of Tarsus from the end of the eighth century to the end of the twelfth century are mentioned in the lists of Michael the Syrian.

Further details for this period are provided in Michael’s narrative and in other Syriac Orthodox narrative sources.  The metropolitan Habib of Tarsus (793/817) consecrated the patriarch Yohannan III in 847.   The metropolitan Athanasius of Tarsus (896/909) consecrated the patriarch Yohannan V in 936.   The metropolitan Athanasius of Tarsus, consecrated in the reign of the patriarch Dionysius IV Heheh (1032–42), is apparently mentioned by Michael the Syrian, though he does not feature in Michael’s lists.   The metropolitan Basil of Tarsus (1042/57) was the secretary of the patriarch Yohannan bar ʿAbdon.

The archdiocese of Tarsus evidently continued to flourish into the thirteenth century, though there are only two brief references to its metropolitans.  The metropolitan Athanasius of Tarsus was present at a synod held in 1264.  The metropolitan Yohannan of Tarsus, 'from the monastery of Mar Hnanya', was among the fifteen bishops consecrated by the patriarch Philoxenus Nemrud (1283–92).

The archdiocese of Tarsus is not mentioned in any later source, and probably lapsed during the fourteenth century.

See also
 Tarsus, Mersin

Notes

References 
 
 
 Jean-Baptiste Chabot, Chronique de Michel le Syrien, Patriarche Jacobite d'Antiche (1166-1199). Éditée pour la première fois et traduite en francais I-IV (1899;1901;1905;1910; a supplement to volume I containing an introduction to Michael and his work, corrections, and an index, was published in 1924. Reprinted in four volumes 1963, 2010).

Syriac Orthodox dioceses
Oriental Orthodoxy in Turkey

nl:Lijst van Syrisch-orthodoxe aartsbisdommen van Antiochië